Writing anxiety is a term for the tension, worry, nervousness, and a wide variety of other negative feelings that may occur when given a writing task. The degree to which a writer experiences these negative feelings may vary depending on the context of the writing. Some may feel anxious about writing an essay for school, but writing an email on the same topic doesn't trigger the anxiety. Others may feel fine writing a lab report, but writing a letter to loved one triggers the anxiety.  Writing anxiety is therefore a situational experience that depends on a number of factors, including the writing task itself, the environment, personal and audience expectations, and one's previous experiences with writing.  While writing anxiety is often used interchangeably with writer's block, writing anxiety refers to the various feelings of apprehension one associates with a writing task, while writer's block is the effect that it has on one's writing process.

Causes 
Writing anxiety can occur when

 Faced with the pressures of getting good grades at school, college, or university. 
 Having to adapt and learn a new writing style. 
 Tight deadlines or no deadlines.
 Not understanding the writing task.

Managing Writing Anxiety 
There are many ways to manage writing anxiety.

 Asking for assistance from a teacher, a writing group, a friend or family member about the assignment can help understand the assignment and give a direction of which writing style and format is appropriate for the task. 
 Practice writing. It is a skill that can be learned and taught, given the support and guidance from teacher, lecturers and professors.
 Have a plan of what to write out. Work out what to say, what feelings to convey to the reader, how to reach the end goal

References 

Anxiety
Writing